Synowiec is a surname of Polish origin. Notable people with the surname include:

Ludwik Synowiec (1958–2022), Polish ice hockey player
Tadeusz Synowiec (1889–1960), Polish footballer, coach, and journalist

Polish-language surnames